NBA 2K is a series of basketball sports simulation video games developed by Visual Concepts and released annually since 1999. The premise of the series is to emulate the sport of basketball, and more specifically, the National Basketball Association. 

The series was originally published by Sega Sports. Beginning with 2005's NBA 2K6, the series is currently published by 2K Sports. As of 2021, the series consists of twenty-three main installments and several spinoff titles across eighteen different platforms. An official eSports league, the NBA 2K League, launched in 2018. 

Until 2018, the series' primary rival was EA Sports' NBA Live series.

Gameplay
Each installment in the NBA 2K series emulates the National Basketball Association, and present slight improvements over the previous installments. As such, gameplay simulates a typical game of basketball, with the player controlling an entire team or a select player; objectives coincide with the rules of basketball and presentation resembles actual televised NBA games. Various game modes have been featured in the series, allowing for gameplay variety. Numerous elements of the games feature customizable options. Each game features the teams and players from the current NBA season; historic NBA teams and players have also been featured, as have EuroLeague teams and (starting with NBA 2K20) WNBA teams. Fictional players and teams can also be created and compiled.

A staple of the series is its career mode, which has been described as a sports-themed role-playing video game. ESPN NBA Basketball was the first game in the series to feature such a mode, but it wasn't until NBA 2K10 and its successors that the mode became a more integral part of the series. The mode was initially titled 24/7, before being changed to MyPlayer, and settling on MyCareer. The modes center on the basketball career of the player's created player; the player customizes several aspects of their player and plays through their career in the NBA. Key events in the player's career are depicted, such as the draft and their retirement ceremony. A storyline is often present in the modes, and high school and college-level basketball has also been depicted. The player upgrades their player's attributes as they play, and can participate in off-court activities.

Another mainstay of the series is a mode allowing the player to assume control of an NBA franchise, acting as general manager. The mode has been featured in numerous NBA 2K games and is often titled Association; the most recent games in the series feature the MyGM and MyLeague modes. In the modes, the player controls virtually all aspects of a team, rather than just playing games with the team. As the player simulates through seasons, they must satisfy the needs of the team's personnel and the owner.

MyTeam mode, which was introduced in NBA 2K13, focuses on building a team of players and competing against other players' teams online. The player's primary venue for acquiring players for their team is card packs; the player purchases a card pack, which features random items the player can use in the mode, including players. In addition to compiling a select group of players, the player can also customize their team's jerseys and court, among other things. The game mode progressed even further on NBA 2K19, with a MyTeam tournament between the best Xbox and PS4 players for a prize of $250,000 occurring. Other online-focused modes have also been featured in the series, such as Pro-Am, which focuses on players building a team together with their custom players.

In addition to regulation NBA games, street basketball has been featured in numerous games in the series. Created players and real players can be used in such modes; additionally, some celebrities have made appearances as playable characters in the series. In more recent games, the street basketball modes are titled Blacktop and MyPark. Blacktop is structured in the typical style of street basketball. MyPark consists of an open area filled with players who can join different games on different courts. Several games in the series feature a mode which allows the player to hold a slam dunk contest.

Several games in the series have featured game modes that are exclusive to that particular game. NBA 2K11 featured the Jordan Challenge mode, in which players are tasked with recreating some of Michael Jordan's most memorable feats, such as scoring 69 points in a single game. NBA 2K16s mid-game commentary team remains the same, except Kerr has been replaced by Greg Anthony. The pre-game, halftime, and post-game shows now feature the returning Kenny Smith, in addition to Johnson and O'Neal. Director Spike Lee worked on the MyCareer mode. The soundtrack, which features 50 songs, was curated by DJ Khaled, DJ Premier, and DJ Mustard. A companion app featuring Paul George and developed by Cat Daddy Games was released alongside the game.

NBA 2K17

NBA 2K17 was released worldwide in September 2016 for PlayStation 3, PlayStation 4, Xbox 360, Xbox One, Microsoft Windows, Android, and iOS. The game features four different cover athletes, Paul George, Kobe Bryant, Danilo Gallinari, and Pau Gasol. NBA 2K17 still features a three-person commentary team and one sideline reporter, but the personnel has been overhauled. Seven different commentators are present, namely Kevin Harlan, Clark Kellogg, Greg Anthony, Brent Barry, Chris Webber, and Steve Smith, while David Aldridge replaces Burke as sideline reporter. The pre-game, halftime, and post-game presentation trio remains unchanged. The game's soundtrack was compiled by Michael B. Jordan, Grimes, Imagine Dragons, and Noah Shebib, and features 50 songs. A demo of sorts, titled The Prelude, was released prior to the release of the main game. A companion app featuring Karl-Anthony Towns was also released.

NBA 2KVR Experience
On November 22, 2016, a virtual reality NBA 2K title was released. Titled NBA 2KVR Experience, the game is a collection of basketball mini-games and is not part of the main series. It is available for PlayStation VR, HTC Vive, Oculus Rift, and Samsung Gear VR and the user plays as LeBron James. This title uses Unreal Engine 4.

NBA Playgrounds

NBA Playgrounds was released on May 9, 2017.

NBA 2K18

NBA 2K18 was released in September 2017. It is the first game in the series to be released for the Nintendo Switch; it was also released for PlayStation 3, PlayStation 4, Xbox 360, Xbox One, Android, iOS, and Microsoft Windows. Kyrie Irving is the cover athlete. The Legend Edition/Legend Edition Gold versions of the game, which include various physical and digital extras, features Shaquille O'Neal as the cover athlete. The Canadian version of the game features DeMar DeRozan of the Toronto Raptors as its cover athlete. The Neighborhood makes its debut in NBA 2K18. The game's soundtrack consists of 49 licensed songs. Kobe Bryant and Kevin Garnett appear as guest commentators. NBA 2K18 adds seventeen new classic teams as well as an 'All-Time Team' for each franchise.
This was also the last game to be released for the PlayStation 3 and Xbox 360.

NBA 2K Online 2
NBA 2K Online 2 is the second release of the title focusing on the Asian market.

NBA 2K19

NBA 2K19 was released on September 11, 2018, while the 20th Anniversary Edition (which was one year away), featuring the cover athlete LeBron James, was released on September 7, the same day as the release of NBA Live 19. This game marks the first time in the series that a version of the game was not made for the PlayStation 3 or Xbox 360. The game's standard edition cover athlete is Giannis Antetokounmpo of the Milwaukee Bucks, while the cover athlete for the Australian and New Zealand version of the game is Ben Simmons of the Philadelphia 76ers. In addition, Kobe Bryant and Kevin Garnett both return as guest commentators, with analyst Bill Simmons being added to the announcer roster.

NBA 2K Playgrounds 2

NBA 2K Playgrounds 2 was released on October 16, 2018.

NBA 2K Mobile

NBA 2K Mobile was released in November 2018 for iOS and Android. The game was developed by Cat Daddy Games.

NBA 2K20

NBA 2K20 was released on September 6, 2019. The game's standard and deluxe editions' cover athletes are Anthony Davis of the Los Angeles Lakers, while the cover athlete for the Legend Edition is a former Miami Heat player Dwyane Wade, who played for MIA in 2003-2016, 2018-2019.

It is also the first game in the series to include all 12 WNBA teams.

The guest commentator roster of Kobe Bryant, Kevin Garnett, and Bill Simmons all return for 2K20. Following Bryant's death, he was removed from the roster, leaving Garnett and Simmons.

2020s

NBA 2K21

NBA 2K21 was released on September 4, 2020. The cover athlete for the standard edition on the current console generation is Damian Lillard. Zion Williamson is the cover athlete for the standard version of the next console generation, and Kobe Bryant is the cover athlete for the Legend Edition cover for both console generations. The Arcade Edition was released for Apple Arcade on April 2, 2021.

NBA 2K22

NBA 2K22 was released on September 10, 2021. The primary cover athlete is Luka Dončić. The Arcade Edition was released for Apple Arcade on October 19, 2021.

NBA 2K23

NBA 2K23 was released on September 8, 2022. The primary cover athlete for the standard and Digital Deluxe Edition is Devin Booker of the Phoenix Suns, while the cover athlete for the Michael Jordan Edition and Championship Edition is Michael Jordan. The game reintroduces the "Jordan Challenges" from NBA 2K11.

Cover Athletes

Reception
The NBA 2K series has achieved consistent critical and commercial success. Elements of the series that are frequently praised include its presentation, specifically its commentary, attention to detail, and soundtrack, its abundance of content, its overall gameplay, and its consistency in terms of yearly releases without any drastic dips in quality. In recent years, the series has been seen by some critics as superior to other basketball games, specifically in comparison with EA Sports' NBA Live series. 

Conversely, later installments have been criticized for their technical issues, particularly in regards to the online components; the introduction of microtransactions; and the quality of some of the more story-focused incarnations of the MyCareer mode. The series has also been criticized for the lack of innovations in several installments. 

Specifically concerning sales, the NBA 2K series has established itself as one of the better-selling video game franchises. A May 2014 earnings call reported that games in the series have sold over 17 million copies worldwide. A report in February 2017, however, suggested that games in the franchise have sold in excess of 68 million copies. According to one analyst, the most recent entries in the series average at least four million copies sold. The best-selling game in the series is NBA 2K14, which sold over seven million copies; it is also Take-Two Interactive's best-selling sports game. NBA 2K16 is the fastest-selling title in the series, shipping over four million copies within its first week of release. NBA 2K16 sold over 10million units in 2017. As of December 2018, the series has sold over 90million units worldwide, making it the best-selling NBA video game series.

Games in the NBA 2K series have been nominated for multiple awards, from events such as the Spike Video Game Awards and The Game Awards, usually related to being the best sports game of the year.

NBA 2K League

In February 2017, the National Basketball Association, in conjunction with Take-Two Interactive, announced the creation of an esports league centering on the NBA 2K franchise. Known as the NBA 2K League, it commence competition in 2018. It was the first esports league to be operated by a North American professional sports league. The league is structured similarly to the NBA; teams are operated by NBA franchises and feature five professional esports players. The teams compete against each other in the current year's NBA 2K game, and each member of a team only uses their in-game MyPlayer. The league feature a regular season, as well as the playoffs and finals.

Legal issues
Two separate lawsuits have been filed against Take-Two related to their recreation of tattoos on NBA players recreated in the series. The first suit was filed by Solid Oak Sketches, filed in January 2016, after trying to seek a  licensing agreement to use the registered copyrighted tattoos with Take-Two. LeBron James had submitted a statement supporting Take-Two, in that he asserted he has given the company the license use his image in their cases, which included his tattoos from Solid Oak Sketches, but this conclusion was thrown out by the judge. In March 2020, a federal District Court judge ruled that while the tattoos were copyrighted elements their use in the games were small enough to meet de minimis  considerations, and that further, due to the nature of tattooing, an implicit license to use the tattoos was granted by the license granted for using the players' likeness. The judge summarily dismissed the case, as well as asserting that broadly, video games using licensed likenesses of players with their tattoos will be using the tattoo art within fair use. The defence of fair use was applicable to the defendants as the purpose of the tattoos in the game (to create a realistic depiction of the players) was satisfactorily transformative in comparison to their original purpose (as a form of self-expression through body art).

A separate lawsuit was filed by tattoo artist James Hayden in December 2017; Hayden asserted that Take-Two's recreation of his tattoos designed for NBA players like LeBron James within NBA 2K16 and onward were copyright infringements. Take-Two sought a summary judgement to close the case, but by March 2019, the preceding judge gave partial summary to Take-Two, but left the main question of copyright infringement open. Hayden has failed to register the copyrights until after NBA 2K16 was released, leaving 2K17 and onward potentially liable to be determined in a court trial. One question raised by the judge was whether the NBA 2K series was an ongoing game with annual updates, or if each release was considered a substantial new work, meaning that any copyright violation would apply repeatedly to all three post-2016 games in the series or as a singular violation.

References

External links

NBA 2K
2K Games franchises
Esports games
Take-Two Interactive franchises
Video game franchises
Video game franchises introduced in 1999
Sports video games by series